Whatever's on Your Mind is the seventh studio album by English indie rock band Gomez released on 6 June 2011 by ATO Records. As with their last album, production on Whatever's on Your Mind was overseen by the band as well as Brian Deck, known for his work on albums from bands such as Modest Mouse, Counting Crows and Iron & Wine.

Track listing
All tracks by Gomez except where noted

"Options"
"I Will Take You There "
"Whatever's on Your Mind"
"Just as Lost as You"
"The Place and the People"
"Our Goodbye"
"Song in My Heart"
"Equalize"
"That Wolf"
"X-Rays"

Personnel
 Ian Ball – vocals, guitar
 Ben Ottewell – vocals, guitar
 Paul Blackburn – bass
 Tom Gray – vocals, guitar, keyboards
 Olly Peacock – drums, synths, computers

References

External links
 

Gomez (band) albums
2011 albums
Albums produced by Brian Deck
ATO Records albums